Jarrah or Eucalyptus marginata is one of the most common species of Eucalyptus tree in the southwest of Western Australia.

Jarrah may also refer to:
 Jarrah (name), a name (and list of people with the name)
 Jarrah (surgeon), a type of medical practitioner in India
 Jarrah Forest,  an interim Australian bioregion in Western Australia
 Jarrah Records, an Australian music label
 Jarrah, an Australasian brand of flavoured instant coffee

See also
 Jarrah dieback, the soil-borne disease caused by Phytophthora cinnamomi
 Jarrahdale, Western Australia, historic logging community
 Jarreh (disambiguation), places in Iran
 Sheikh Jarrah, a neighborhood in Jerusalem
 Yarra (disambiguation)